Thiersee is a large municipality in the Kufstein district in the Austrian state of Tyrol located 5 km west of Kufstein, below the northern border with Bavaria, Germany.

The village was mentioned for the first time in documents in 1224 and belonged to Bavaria until 1504. At the beginning of the 20th century Thiersee was a peasant community without concerning traffic engineering. A street from Kufstein to Thiersee was built during World War I.

From 1946 to 1952, the village was center of the Austrian film production. Main sources of income at present are agriculture, passion play and tourism.

References

External links
 Official website

Cities and towns in Kufstein District